Yod or YOD may refer to:

Language 
 Yod (sound), the /j/ glide—as in the English word you'''s initial phoneme
 Yodh, the tenth letter of many Semitic alphabets

 People 
 Father Yod (1922–1975), American esoteric spiritual leader and restaurateur
 Leslie Daiken (1912–1964; nicknamed Yod), Irish writer, editor and activist

 Other uses 
 Yod (astrology), an aspect formation
 CFB Cold Lake, a Royal Canadian Air Force base in Alberta  (IATA code: YOD)
 Year of the Dolphin, a 2007 United Nations Environment Programme observance
 Yods, characters in the 1999 Outcast'' video game

See also
 Yad, the Jewish religious pointing device
 Ecstatic yod, a record label run by music critic Byron Coley
 Yod-dropping and yod-coalescence, sound changes in English